Lutz Moik (1930–2002) was a German film and television actor. He achieved his breakthrough with the leading role in the fairytale film Heart of Stone in 1950.

Filmography
{| class="wikitable"
|-
! Year
! Title
! Role
! Notes
|-
|1945|| Meine Herren Söhne || Lutz Redwitz ||
|-
|1945|| Frühlingsmelodie || ||
|-
|1947|| And If We Should Meet Again || Wolfgang ||
|-
|1948|| Thank You, I'm Fine || Otto Holk ||
|-
|1948|| 1-2-3 Corona || Gerhard Wittmann ||
|-
|1949|| Und wenn's nur einer wär''' || Michael ||
|-
|1950|| Five Suspects || Klaus Eriksen ||
|-
|1950|| Bürgermeister Anna || Matthias Lehmkuhl ||
|-
|1950|| Heart of Stone || Peter Munk ||
|-
|1951|| The Guilt of Doctor Homma || Gerhard Homma ||
|-
|1951|| Hanna Amon || Thomas Amon ||
|-
|1952|| The Merry Vineyard || Jochen Most ||
|-
|1953|| Christina || Klaus Stauffer ||
|-
|1956|| My Sixteen Sons || Christian Massow||
|-
|1956|| Teenage Wolfpack || Kudde || Voice, Uncredited
|-
|1956|| Das verbotene Paradies || Karl Wetterstein ||
|-
|1958|| Iron Gustav || Otto Kroppke ||
|-
|1960|| Heaven, Love and Twine || Erich Hofmann ||
|-
|1960||  || Fähnrich Kramer ||
|-
|1965|| The Oil Prince || Paddy || Voice, Uncredited
|-
|1965|| The Desperado Trail || Schneller Panther || Voice, Uncredited
|-
|1978|| Pastorale 1943 || Duitser ||
|}

References

Bibliography
 Goble, Alan. The Complete Index to Literary Sources in Film''. Walter de Gruyter, 1999.

External links

1930 births
2002 deaths
German male television actors
German male film actors
Male actors from Berlin